Balanga Cathedral, formally known as Diocesan Shrine and Cathedral Parish of St. Joseph in Balanga, Bataan, is the seat of the Diocese of Balanga which comprises entire of the civil province of Bataan.  Currently, Ernesto B. De Leon and Prudencio “Denz” B. Dumaguing, Jr. serve as the cathedral priests. On March 19, 2015, the cathedral was formally declared a diocesan shrine.

History 
During the Japanese invasion the cathedral was used as an artillery emplacement to bombard Mt. Samat, where the Filipino-American troops made their last stand. It was later renovated by the first bishop of the Diocese, Celso Guevarra and made its patron saint, Saint Joseph.

Bishops

Interior and exterior 

After the war Bishop Celso renovated the church. Its walls were white and a number of chandeliers hung from the ceiling, the largest before the altar. Behind the altar was a structure painted green with stripes of gold and a statue of Jesus in the left, Mary on the right, and Joseph holding the hand of Baby Jesus. Beside the altar, there were two statues, Lorenzo Ruiz in the left and Mary at the right. There was a group of bells lined together vertically by metal grilles, the usual bell design in almost all of the parishes in Bataan. There was a statue of Jesus of Nazareth near the main door, which was kept for rehabilitation, believed to be miraculous. People lined up and gave sampaguitas to its neck and cross, they would usually wipe its feet. Along the cathedral's aisle are the coat of arms of respective bishops of Balanga that were added during their installation dates, with the latest is the coat of arms of Bishop Ruperto Santos which was added when he became bishop of the diocese on July 8, 2010.

When Bishop Socrates Villegas became Bishop of Balanga on July 3, 2004, he saw that the decorations were in bad shape; he renovated the inside with a new design. When it was finished, the white walls were replaced by a wall of bricks, the structure behind the altar became marble white, the floors were higher, the lectern bearing the coat of arms of diocese of Balanga was replaced with the one with Holy Spirit, and the chandeliers were replaced by ceiling lights. A few months before he became archbishop of Lingayen-Dagupan in Pangasinan on November 4, 2009, which ended his term as Bishop of Balanga, images featuring the ancestors of Jesus and image of Jesus Christ at the cathedral's dome were added. Outside the cathedral are the statues of saints with their names which were also added during Socrates Villegas' term as Bishop of Balanga.

More improvements on the exterior of the cathedral were made during the term of Bishop Ruperto Santos, such as the improvement of patio and discouraging the numerous vendors within the cathedral's premises. Pavement of the ground on the exterior was made from 2017 to 2018, and the belfry added the bricks in 2019.

Feast of the patron saint 

The feast day of Saint Joseph is celebrated twice annually in the city of Balanga, on March 19 and the "pistang bayan" every April 28.

Image gallery

See also

 Roman Catholicism in the Philippines
 Roman Catholic Diocese of Balanga

References

External links
 CBCP Diocese of Balanga
 Roman Catholic Diocese of Balanga
 Coordinates
 CBCP Website
 GCatholic
 GCatholic

Roman Catholic cathedrals in the Philippines
Balanga, Bataan
Tourist attractions in Bataan
Roman Catholic churches in Bataan
Churches in the Roman Catholic Diocese of Balanga